The swan goose (Anser cygnoides) is a large goose with a natural breeding range in inland Mongolia, northernmost China, and the Russian Far East. It is migratory and winters mainly in central and eastern China. Vagrant birds are encountered in Japan and Korea (where it used to winter in numbers when it was more common), and more rarely in Kazakhstan, Laos, coastal Siberia, Taiwan, Thailand and Uzbekistan.

While uncommon in the wild, this species has been domesticated. Introduced and feral populations of its domestic breeds occur in many places outside its natural range. The wild form is also kept in collections, and escapes are not unusual amongst feral flocks of other Anser and Branta geese.

Description

The sexes are similar, although the male is larger, with a proportionally longer bill and neck; in fact the largest females are barely as large as the smallest males.

The upperparts are greyish-brown, with thin light fringes to the larger feathers and a maroon hindneck and cap (reaching just below the eye).  The remiges are blackish, as are the entire underwing and the white-tipped rectrices, while the upper- and undertail coverts are white. A thin white stripe surrounds the bill base. Apart from darker streaks on the belly and flanks, the underside is pale buff, being especially light on the lower head and foreneck which are sharply delimited against the maroon. In flight, the wings appear dark, with no conspicuous pattern. Uniquely among its genus, the long, heavy bill is completely black; the legs and feet, on the other hand, are orange as in most of its relatives. The eyes' irides are maroon. Juveniles are duller than adult birds, and lack the white bill base and dark streaks on the underside.

The voice is a loud drawn-out and ascending honking aang. As a warning call, a similar but more barking honk is given two or three times in short succession.

The karyotype of the swan goose is 2n=80, consisting of four pairs of macrochromosomes, 35 pairs of microchromosomes, and a pair of sex chromosomes. The two largest macrochromosome pairs as well as the Z (female) chromosome are submetacentric, while the third-largest chromosome pair is acrocentric and the fourth-largest is metacentric. The W chromosomes are acrocentric too, as are the larger microchromosomes, the smaller ones probably being telocentric. Compared to the greylag goose, there seems to have been some rearrangement on the fourth-largest chromosome pair.

Ecology
It inhabits steppe to taiga and mountain valleys near freshwater, grazing on plants such as sedges (Cyperaceae), grasses (Poaceae) and water plants, and rarely swimming. It forms small flocks outside the breeding season. In the winter, it grazes on plains and stubble fields, sometimes far from water. Birds return from the winter quarters around April, and the breeding season starts soon thereafter. It breeds as single pairs or loose groups near marshes and other wetlands, with nesting activity starting about May. The clutch is usually 5–6 but sometimes up to 8 eggs, which are laid in a shallow nest made from plants, placed directly on the ground, often on a small knoll to keep it dry. The precocial young hatch after about 28 days and become sexually mature at 2–3 years of age. Around late August/early September, the birds leave for winter quarters, where they gather in small groups to moult their worn plumage.

The swan goose was uplisted from Near Threatened to Vulnerable on the IUCN Red List in 1992 and further to Endangered in 2000, as its population is declining due to habitat loss and excessive hunting and (particularly on the Sanjiang Plain in China) egg collecting. But new research has shown it to be not as rare as it was believed, and consequently, it was downlisted to Vulnerable status again in 2008. Still, less than 500 pairs might remain in Russia, while in Mongolia numbers are unknown though about 1,000 were seen at Ögii Lake in 1977. Favorite wintering locations in China are Lake Dongting, Lake Poyang, the Yancheng Coastal Wetlands and other locations around the lower Yangtze River, where some 60,000 individuals may be found each year – though this may be almost the entire world population. Until the 1950s, the species wintered in small numbers (up to about 100 birds annually) in Japan, but habitat destruction has driven them away. Altogether, between 60,000 and 100,000 adult Swan Geese remain in the wild today.

Domestication
Though the majority of domestic geese are descended from the greylag goose (A. anser), two breeds are direct descendants of the swan goose: the Chinese goose and the African goose. These breeds have been domesticated since at least the mid-18th century – perhaps even (in China) since around 1000 BC. They vary considerably from their wild parent in appearance, temperament, and ability to produce meat and eggs; the most conspicuous feature is the prominent bill knob<ref></small> PDF fulltext</ref> and upright posture.

Charles Darwin studied goose breeds as part of his work on the theory of evolution. He noted that the external differences between Chinese geese and breeds descended from the Greylag goose belied a rather close relationship:
"The hybrids from the common and Chinese geese (A. cygnoides), species which are so different that they are generally ranked in distinct genera, have often bred in this country with either pure parent, and in one single instance they have bred inter se."

Conservation
The species is currently classified as Vulnerable by the IUCN based on ongoing population declines and range losses, exacerbated by recent poor breeding success and unsustainable levels of hunting. Total population was estimated as 60–90,000 individuals in 2012.

Gallery

References

External links

 Media of the swan goose at the Internet Bird Collection

Swan Goose
Swan Goose
Birds of Asia
Birds of Mongolia
Birds of Manchuria
Birds described in 1758
Taxa named by Carl Linnaeus
Taxobox binomials not recognized by IUCN